Arne Haaland (born 15 February 1936) is a Norwegian chemist.

He took the Dr. philos. degree at the University of Oslo in 1969. He was an associate professor in chemistry at the University of Oslo from 1964 to 1984, and then professor until his retirement. He is a fellow of the Norwegian Academy of Science and Letters.

Haaland run a laboratory for gas electron diffraction. He, his co-workers and colleagues determined the structures of umpteen important chemical compounds in the gas phase. His main field of activity were the organometallic compounds.

The list of such structure determinations includes the controversially debated beryllocene, dibenzene chromium, ferrocene, the structure of the phosphorus oxides P4O10 and P4O9, trimethylamuminium and its adducts with NMe3, and the first stable silylene.

Haaland is also the author of many contributions on chemical bonding, in particular the dative bond and metallocenes.

References

1936 births
Living people
Norwegian chemists
Academic staff of the University of Oslo
Members of the Norwegian Academy of Science and Letters